The Unlimited Athletics Club Power Hitters are a professional volleyball club which was set to play in the Premier Volleyball League (formerly Shakey's V-League).

History 
The Unlimited Athletics Club was originally formed as the Peak Form Lady Spikers and slated to be one of the new teams debuting in the Premier Volleyball League's 2021 season. The team was organized by Jovito Ong of the Philippine Confederation of Sports Development Foundation and sponsored by Peak Form, a sports conditioning and recovery center. In March 2021, the team reverted their name to UAC. On June 28, 2021, the PVL announced that the team has taken a leave of absence due to its inability to complete its roster for the 2021 PVL Open Conference.

Current roster 
For the 2021 Premier Volleyball League Open Conference.

Head coach
  Edgar Barroga
| valign="top" |

 Team Captain
 Import
 Draft Pick
 Rookie
 Inactive
 Suspended
 Free Agent
 Injured

Honors

Team

Coaches 
  Edgar Barroga (2021)

Team captain
  Maria Carmela Tunay (2021)

References 

2021 establishments in the Philippines
Women's volleyball teams in the Philippines